Wulf Erich Barsch von Benedikt (born August 27, 1943 in Reudnitz) is an American Latter-day Saint artist and professor at Brigham Young University (BYU).

Life
Barsch was born in Reudnitz. While his full name is Wulf Erich Barsch von Benedikt, he uses Wulf Barsch as his professional name.

He studied under Bauhaus Masters, who were themselves Master Students of Paul Klee and Wassily Kandinsky.  
He joined the Church of Jesus Christ of Latter-day Saints (LDS Church) in 1966, and subsequently served a mission for the LDS Church in northern California.
 
Barsch received a master's degree equivalent in Germany from Werkkenschule, Hanover in 1968, a Master of Arts degree from BYU in 1970, and a Master of Fine Arts degree from BYU in 1971, and then joined the faculty at BYU in 1972.
Barsch was a leader in the second wave of the Art and Belief Movement.  He retired from teaching at BYU in 2010.

In 1975, Barsch won the Rome Prize. His work is recognized as some of the better modern religious art work. His works include "Book of Abraham".  In 2011, his work, "The Book of Walking Forth by Day" was included in an exhibit of Mormon art at the Church History Museum in Salt Lake City, Utah.

Notes

References 
 "Visual Arts" article in Encyclopedia of Mormonism.
 AskArt entry for Barsch

Further reading 
 

1943 births
Living people
20th-century Mormon missionaries
American Latter Day Saints
American Mormon missionaries
Brigham Young University alumni
Brigham Young University faculty
Converts to Mormonism
German emigrants to the United States
Latter Day Saint artists
Mormon missionaries in the United States
People from Barnim